Lingfield College is a private day school situated in Lingfield in the English county of Surrey, for pupils aged six months to eighteen years old. It was originally a boarding school for girls and became fully co-educational in 1996. As of 2022 there are approximately 940 pupils at the School spread over two sites situated next to one another: the Prep School and the Senior School. The School is a member of the Headmasters' and Headmistresses Conference.

History 
Lingfield College was founded in 1940 by three members of the Roman Catholic School Sisters of Notre Dame as an all-girls school. They had arrived from Faversham, Kent with fourteen young evacuees and set up a school. The School originally occupied houses in Lingfield, before the purchase of Batnors Hall (the current site of the Prep School) and Ivy House (the current site of the Senior School), both on the edge of the village, and close by to Lingfield Racecourse. Ivy House was renamed Le Clerc House, after Alix Le Clerc, the founder of the sixteenth-century order from which the Sisters' congregation was descended.

The School was expanded over both sites in the 1950s and 1960s; however by the early 1980s, a decline in vocations made the Sisters feel the need to focus their now more limited resources elsewhere in the world. They left Lingfield in 1986. The School's governance was turned over to a lay educational trust, after which boarding was discontinued and lay senior staff and a board of governors were appointed to replace the Sisters. In 1996 the school became fully co-educational, after the appointment of Nuala Shepley as Head Mistress in 1992.

In 2011, Nuala Shepley retired and Richard Bool (formerly of Ardingly College and Sherborne) was appointed as the new Headmaster.

House System 
Lingfield has four School Houses, originally named after the Saints and renamed in September 2013 to Bell, Clubb, Higgins and Yeates as a mark of respect and gratitude to the four original Trustees who created the charitable trust after the Notre Dame Sisters. Pupils in the Senior School are assigned to one of the four houses when they start at the School.

GCSE, iGCSE and A Level 
At GCSE or iGCSE most students normally take seven compulsory subjects and choose three further options.

Students typically study three subjects at A Level but have the option to choose four. This may be a combination of A Levels and BTECs.

References 

School Sisters of Notre Dame 
Sister Gisela's story

External links 
School website
ISI Reports 2017 and 2020
Profile on the Headmasters Conference website
Profile on the Independent Schools Council website
Overview on the Charities Commission website
Profile on the Muddy Stilettos website

Private schools in Surrey
Educational institutions established in 1940
1940 establishments in England
School Sisters of Notre Dame schools